Palazzo Tommaso Campanella, mostly called Palazzo Campanella, is a major building in Reggio Calabria, Italy, as it is the seat of the Regional Council of Calabria (Consiglio Regionale della Calabria).

Overview
Dedicated to the Calabrian philosopher Tommaso Campanella, this building is located in the street called Cardinale Portanova.

References

Buildings and structures in Reggio Calabria